Stanislav Kyrylovych Strebko (28 February 1937 – 28 July 2008) was a Soviet seafarer and Ukrainian politician.

See also 
 Port of Chornomorsk

References

Stanislav Kyrylovych Strebko. Official Ukraine Today portal.
Buzalo, V. Stanislav Strebko. Encyclopedia of History of Ukraine.
 Stanislav Strebko as a president of FC Portovyk Illichivsk

1937 births
2008 deaths
People from Zaporizhzhia Oblast
Soviet sailors
Communist Party of Ukraine (Soviet Union) politicians
Party of Industrialists and Entrepreneurs of Ukraine politicians
People's Party (Ukraine) politicians
Fourth convocation members of the Verkhovna Rada
Recipients of the Order of State
Recipients of the title of Hero of Ukraine
Recipients of the Order of Merit (Ukraine), 3rd class
Recipients of the Order of Merit (Ukraine), 2nd class
Recipients of the Order of Friendship of Peoples
Ukrainian football chairmen and investors
FC Portovyk Illichivsk